...art is the third studio album from the Australian rock band, Regurgitator, released in August 1999. The album was recorded in Byron Bay and was the final album with drummer Martin Lee. ...art peaked at number 2 on the ARIA Charts and was certified gold.

Track listing
 "Happiness (Rotting My Brain)" (Q. Yeomans) – 3:56
 "Ghost" (B. Ely) – 3:40
 "Freshmint!" (Q. Yeomans) – 3:55
 "Strange Human Being" (Q. Yeomans) – 4:25
 "I Wanna Be a Nudist" (B. Ely) – 2:02
 "I Like Repetitive Music" (Q. Yeomans) – 2:40
 "Art" (B. Ely) – 1:05
 "Feels Alright!" (B. Ely) – 3:45
 "I Love Tommy Mottola" (Q. Yeomans) – 4:10
 "Are U Being Served?" (Q. Yeomans) – 5:00
 "Obtusian" (M. Lee/B. Ely) – 3:08
 "The Lonely Guy" (Q. Yeomans) – 4:10
 "Virtual Life" (B. Ely) – 4:57
 "Metal" (B. Ely, hidden track)  – 1:22

Track information
 "Are U Being Served?" contains samples from the 70's UK BBC comedy Are You Being Served? theme song.
 Following the end of Virtual Life, there is six minutes of silence before "Metal" plays; album pressings list Virtual Life as 12:19.

Charts

Weekly charts

Year-end charts

Certifications

Release history

References

Regurgitator albums
1999 albums
East West Records albums
Warner Music Group albums